Niagara Falls High School is a public high school located at 4455 Porter Road in Niagara Falls, New York, United States. It  was established and dedicated on September 1, 2000 and opened 5 days later, becoming the city's only public high school, with the merging of the original Niagara Falls High School and the former LaSalle Senior High School. The school's graduation rate is 71%, slightly below the state average.

Niagara Falls City School District
Niagara Falls High School is operated under the supervision of the Niagara Falls City School District. It is the only high school in the district since the merger of the original Niagara Falls High School and LaSalle Senior High School. The high school is fed by two preparatory schools, Gaskill Prep and LaSalle Prep, which host grades 7 and 8.

Notable alumni
 Jermaine Crumpton - Professional basketball player for T71 Dudelange
 Jonny Flynn - Former professional basketball player
 Paul Harris - Former professional basketball player
 Sal Maglie - Professional baseball player
 Rick Manning - Professional baseball player
 James Starks - Former Green Bay Packers running back
 Tommy Tedesco - Guitarist and studio musician
 Jane Bryant Quinn - Financial journalist

References

External links
Niagara Falls High School website

Buildings and structures in Niagara Falls, New York
Schools in Niagara County, New York
School buildings completed in 2000
Public high schools in New York (state)
2000 establishments in New York (state)